Warneckea is a genus of plant in family Melastomataceae. It contains the following species (but this list may be incomplete):
 Warneckea cordiformis R. D. Stone
 Warneckea memecyloides (Benth.) H.Jacques-Felix
 Warneckea wildeana Jacq.-Fel.

External links

 
Melastomataceae genera
Taxonomy articles created by Polbot